L-value, L value or lvalue may refer to:

 In astronomy, a measure of brightness of a lunar eclipse on the Danjon scale
 L-value (computer science), denoting an object to which values can be assigned
 In number theory, the value of an L-function
 In space physics, the value assigned to an L-shell, a particular set of planetary magnetic field lines

See also 
 R-value (disambiguation)